Zita Swoon is a Belgian indie rock group. They entered the music scene of Antwerp in 1993, still under the name A Beatband with the EP Jintro Travels The Word In A Skirt. The group is typical of the music scene in Antwerp, with members playing in numerous other groups. The best known member is singer, musician and composer Stef Kamil Carlens, who founded the group together with Aarich Jespers and also played in dEUS. 

The same group released Everyday I Wear A Greasy Black Feather On My Hat under the name Moondog Jr. in 1995. Shortly thereafter they encountered legal trouble over the name Moondog with Louis T. Hardin, and changed it to Zita Swoon (Zita = intense, Swoon = desire). The success of this album was awarded with invitations to the Lowlands, Pinkpop and Rock Werchter festivals. The same year they also appeared live on MTV in Most Wanted with Michael Blair.

Their first appearance in the US was at the South by Southwest festival in 1998. Zita Swoon has played in numerous locations, from New York to the Belgian Rock Werchter festival, the Holland Festival, as well as in Germany. In early 1999 their work was recognized by the Flemish government with a grant of 1.5 million Francs and the title Cultural Ambassador of Flanders (a title previously awarded to DAAU and dEUS).

In 2009 Stef Kamil Carlens participated with Lexus Concert, a 'hybrid' concert where Stef does a crossover concert at Klara festival with a musician from a totally different style and background. The winner of Lexus concert wins a private try out concert on board a new Lexus RX 450h.

Members

Original members

 Stef Kamil Carlens – vocals, guitar, piano
 Aarich Jespers – drums, percussion

Additional members
 Amel Serra – percussion
 Joris Caluwaerts – piano, rhodes
 Bart Van Lierde – bass
 Eva Gysel – backing vocals
 Kapinga Gysel – backing vocals

Ex-members
 Tom Pintens – guitar, backing vocals, piano, clarinet (as of April 2008)
 Kobe Proesmans – percussion
 Thomas de Smet – bass
 Bjorn Eriksson – guitar
 Benjamin Boutreur – saxophone
 Leonie Gysel – backing vocals

Discography

As A Beatband
 Jintro Travels the Word in a Skirt (1993)

As Moondog Jr.
 Everyday I Wear A Greasy Black Feather On My Hat (1995)

As Zita Swoon
Studio albums:
 I Paint Pictures on a Wedding Dress (1998)
 Life = A Sexy Sanctuary (2001)
 A Song About a Girls (2004)
 Big City (2007)
 Big Blueville (2008)
Live albums:
 Live at Jet Studio Brussels (2001)
 A Band in a Box (CD and DVD) (2005)
Soundtracks:
 Music inspired by Sunrise, a film by F.W. Murnau (1997)
 Plage Tattoo/Circumstances (music from the performance) (2000)
Compilations:
 To Play, To Dream, To Drift – An Anthology (2009)

As Zita Swoon Group

 Dancing With The Sound Hobbyist (2011)
 Wait for Me (2012)
 New Old World (2014)
 Nothing That Is Everything (2015)

See also

 Indie rock in Belgium

External links
 Official website
 Fansite
 Archive
 Last.fm group

Belgian alternative rock groups